Dmitry Leontiyevich Ovtsyn (unknown - after 1757) was a Russian hydrographer and Arctic explorer. The Ovtsyn family is one of the oldest Russian noble families, originating from the descendants of Rurik, the Murom princes.

Ovtsyn's biography
Ovtsyn's childhood coincided with the time of Peter the Great's transformations in Russia. When Ovtsyn graduated from the Academy, he became a Navigator. While still a student at the Academy in 1725, he took part in the first long-distance foreign voyage of the young Russian fleet. 
In 1726 Ovtsyn graduated from the Academy and from 1726 to 1729 sailed on the same frigate "Amsterdam-Galey" as a Navigator student, then a Navigator. The young sailor soon attracted the attention of his superiors and was appointed to the post of adjutant to the chief commander of the Kronstadt port, which at that time was Admiral Thomas Gordon. In 1732, Ovtsyn was promoted to the rank of "non-Lieutenant from the soldiers". Two years later, due to his having experience and excellent knowledge in navigational and hydrographic matters, Ovtsyn was appointed to the great Northern expedition, led by Vitus Bering.
In 1734–1738, Ovtsyn led one of the units of the Second Kamchatka expedition that charted the coastline of the Kara Sea east of the river Ob. In summer of 1737, his unit made its way from Ob to Yenisei and made the first hydrographic description of this part of the Siberian coastline. In 1741, Ovtsyn took part in Vitus Bering's voyage to the shores of America.

Honours
A cape on the Taimyr Peninsula and a strait between the islands Oleniy and Sibiryakov bear his name.

See also
 Russian Hydrographic Service

References
Ovtsyn's biography 

18th-century births
18th-century deaths
Explorers from the Russian Empire
Explorers of Asia
Kara Sea
Explorers of the Arctic
Year of birth unknown
Year of death unknown
18th-century people from the Russian Empire
Great Northern Expedition